Brita Pia Baldus (born 4 June 1965 in Leipzig, Saxony) is a German diver, who competed for East Germany until the unification in 1991. She was affiliated with the Sportclub Deutsche Hochschule für Körperkultur in Leipzig.

She participated in the 1988 Summer Olympics for East Germany, placing seventh in the 3 metre springboard event. She then won a bronze medal in the same event at the 1992 Summer Olympics.

References
databaseOlympics
 

1965 births
Living people
German female divers
Divers at the 1988 Summer Olympics
Olympic divers of East Germany
Divers at the 1992 Summer Olympics
Olympic divers of Germany
Olympic bronze medalists for Germany
Divers from Leipzig
Olympic medalists in diving
Medalists at the 1992 Summer Olympics
World Aquatics Championships medalists in diving
Universiade medalists in diving
Universiade gold medalists for Germany
Medalists at the 1987 Summer Universiade
Medalists at the 1991 Summer Universiade
Medalists at the 1993 Summer Universiade
Sportspeople from Leipzig